The Louisville Cardinals football team represents the University of Louisville in the sport of American football. The Cardinals compete in the Football Bowl Subdivision (FBS) of the National Collegiate Athletic Association (NCAA) and compete in the Atlantic Coast Conference.

History

Early history (1912–1924)
The University of Louisville began playing football in 1912 where the Cardinals went 3–1. Louisville had played several years at club level and teams were mostly composed with medical students. Beginning in 1914 the Cardinals joined the Southern Intercollegiate Athletic Association (SIAA) and they would participate in Kentucky Intercollegiate Athletic Conference (KIAC). Due to financial difficulty Louisville did not participate in the 1917–1921 seasons.

When the Cardinals did rejoin football they came back into the SIAA which was going through reorganization losing most major state schools and thus became a small college conference. The Cardinals would face mostly Kentucky state schools such as Eastern Kentucky, Murray State, Western Kentucky, and Morehead State, along with private state schools like Centre, Transylvania, Kentucky Wesleyan, and Georgetown College.

Tom King era (1925–1930)

Tom King was the first coach to attempt to build a program at Louisville. King played college football at Notre Dame (1915–1916) under Coach Palmer and Knute Rockne. King was an undersized end for the Irish and was known for his athleticism and speed. Before he came to the football team for punt returns he was on the track team and basketball team, where he was named captain in 1916. His experience at Notre Dame gave him ideas on developing a spread wing offense so his undersized players could be better utilized.

His first standout was Fred Koster; at only 160 pounds he was not big enough to play at Male High School. Koster drew national attention to Louisville in 1926 by racking up 68 points in his first 2 games of the season. In six games, Koster scored 18 touchdowns, 10 extra points, and 2 field goals and went on to finish second in scoring in college football with 124 points. Koster was an all-around athlete and was a letterman 16 times, 4 times in each baseball, basketball, football, and track. Koster was a standout forward for the basketball team, leading the team in scoring two years. In baseball, Koster played professionally for 10 years for the Philadelphia Phillies (one season) as well as the minor league teams Louisville Colonels and St. Paul Saints in the American Association.

Tom King had the program going in the right direction until he decided to play Detroit for $10,000. Rockne who was head coach at Notre Dame, and a fellow graduate called King and asked if he would take the Detroit game because Rockne felt his team was not up to it. When King asked what was in it for Louisville Rockne replied $10,000, which was a substantial sum of money in 1928 for an athletics department. Louisville started the season with a 72–0 win over Eastern Kentucky but when they traveled to Detroit they were hammered with injuries and did not win another game or score for the rest of the season, as Detroit went undefeated and claimed a share of the national title.

King served as head football coach for two more years but he also served as track, baseball, basketball and athletic director during his tenure at Louisville. Louisville athletics took a step back when Dr. Raymond Kent was announced as the new president of Louisville. Dr. Kent began reducing the budget in the athletics department, making it difficult for teams to travel and outfit themselves. King on the advice of his friend Rockne moved on and in 1933 became assistant coach at Michigan State.

Louisville Athletics took a step back across all sports and in football posted one winning season until World War II. With the onset of World War II, Louisville, like many college athletic programs around the country, was put on suspension until 1946. During that time Louisville played mostly within KIAC and posted a 73–118–8 record with a .378 winning percentage.

Frank Camp era (1946–1968)

Frank Camp revived the Cardinal Program in 1946 after World War II ended. Camp was collegiate player at Transylvania University in both football and basketball went on to accumulate a 102–35–04 record as a high school coach before he was tabbed for the head job at Louisville. Camp was responsible for moving away from the traditional KIAC competition and moving towards a more competitive schedule including match ups against some powerhouse traditional teams. Camp would see success early after going 7–0–1 in his second year and was accredited for being able to gel current players with the new recruits returning from war.

Camp, like King, would see another President pull resources and scholarships in the early 1950s would see both Otto Knop, who at the time was being recruited by Bear Bryant of Kentucky, and Johnny Unitas, who was being recruited by Indiana, elect to stay at Louisville and play for Camp. Louisville did see a lot of talent leave and they went into a slump from 1950 to 1954. Camp would only suffer two losing seasons for the rest of his career. The loss of the scholarships saw a loss talent on the team. So when scholarships were again available Camp would start to recruit black players and integrate the sports program at Louisville. Camp's legacy is tied to three players he brought to Louisville Johnny Unitas, Lenny Lyles and Otto Knop.

The most enduring legacy Camp left behind was pioneering integration in southern athletics. Camp's first African-American player was Lawrence "Bumpy" Simmons, a local product from Central High School. He only played one year in 1952 and left the team on good terms. Camp would bring in Andy Walker, George Cain and Lenny Lyles in 1954 and they would become the first black scholarship players at Louisville. Once the university was integrated in 1951, Camp and his assistant coach, Wood, sought out potential recruits. Coach Wood would be integral in bringing in Lyles who was also a track star. All three players would go on to become starters and Lyles and Cain would become a dangerous tandem in the backfield.

Camp would introduce the rivalry of Memphis, taking the Cards out of independency and joining the Missouri Valley Conference (MVC) and lead the Cards to their first bowl game during his tenure. The University of Louisville made its first bowl appearance January 1, 1958, as Frank Camp's squad battered Drake 34–20 in the Sun Bowl. The victory over the Drake Bulldogs capped a near-perfect season for the Cardinals. UofL finished with a 9–1 record. Louisville's squad was headed by Lenny Lyles, the nation's leading rusher. Unfortunately, Lyles went down in the first quarter with an injury. He managed just six yards on two carries. In Lyles' absence, Ken Porco and Pete Bryant stepped forward offensively. Porco ran for a game-high 119 yards on 20 carries. Bryant added 80 yards on 14 carries, while also tossing a 20-yard scoring pass.
 
Camp coached the Cardinals until his retirement following the 1968 season. Camp is the Cardinals' all-time wins leader among head coaches in Louisville football history. Camp would also see the Cardinals leave Parkway Field and move to Manual Stadium. The stadium held 17,000 seats and was relief for players because they no longer had to play on a baseball field and it was well lit. The Cards would then move to Old Cardinal Stadium in 1957 and it would serve as their home until they moved to Cardinal Stadium, formerly Papa John's Cardinal Stadium in 1998. In their inaugural season at Cardinal Stadium the Cardinals finished the season 9–1 with their first bowl appearance winning in the Sun Bowl against Drake 34–20. Louisville ended I-A independence by joining the Missouri Valley Conference (MVC) in 1963 only to leave for independency again in 1974. During Camp's tenure at Louisville he amassed a 118–95–2 record with a 1–0 bowl record to become the all-time winningest coach at Louisville. He retired following the 1968 season.

Johnny Unitas
Five games into Johnny Unitas' freshman season (Unitas was allowed to play as a freshman because Louisville did not belong to the NCAA), Unitas entered the game against St. Bonaventure when Louisville was trailing, 19–0. Unitas completed 11 consecutive passes, 3 for touchdowns, in a steady rain and helped put the Cards in front, 21–19. But St. Bonaventure kicked a last-ditch field goal and Louisville lost, 22–21. With Unitas leading the way, Louisville won its next four games, including a 35–28 victory over Houston; Louisville was a 19-point underdog against the Cougars. In that game the Cardinals were leading 28–21 and had the ball on their own eight-yard line in the fourth quarter. After two unsuccessful running plays, Unitas dropped back into his own end zone, sidestepped two defenders and threw a pass to Babe Ray, who scored a 92-yard TD.

In the next day's Louisville Courier-Journal, reporter Jimmy Brown wrote: "If Coach Frank Camp is smart, he'll take Unitas, enclose him in a cellophane bag and put him away with the Cardinals' uniforms for safekeeping over the winter."

In his sophomore season, Unitas completed 77 of his 154 passes and threw 12 TDs. Louisville went 3–8 that year. At Florida State, Unitas completed 17 of 22 passes in a 41–14 victory. Louisville, though, almost lost Unitas after his sophomore season after an administrative hassle which saw 15 players dismissed from school, leaving the Cardinal roster empty.
Unitas thought about leaving and transferring to Indiana. But, he decided against leaving when he was reminded that Indiana shunned him earlier in his career. Unitas holds just a few records at Louisville, most of them eclipsed by quarterbacks John Madeya, Ed Rubbert, Browning Nagle, Jeff Brohm, Marty Lowe, Chris Redman, Dave Ragone and Stefan LeFors. Unitas finished his career completing 247 of 502 passes for 2,912 yards and 27 touchdowns.

Unitas left Louisville and became the ninth-round pick of the Pittsburgh Steelers in 1955, but was cut by them in a numbers game. The Steelers had four quarterbacks; they only needed three. Unitas was the odd man out.

Unitas took a job with a Pittsburgh tiling company following the cut and then he joined the Bloomfield Rams, a semi-pro team. He made six dollars a game. But Unitas did not linger long in the bush league. The Colts got wind of him and invited him for a tryout. He made the team, signing for $7,000.

Unitas was inducted into the Pro Football Hall of Fame in 1979 and his record 47-consecutive-game touchdown passes is a record compared to Joe DiMaggio's 56-game hitting streak. (Drew Brees broke the record in 2012.)

Lenny Lyles
A trailblazer in the integration of the Louisville Cardinals football program, Lenny Lyles was an outstanding player on both sides of the football from 1954 to 1957. Although he faced many unwelcoming crowds in his time at Louisville he always had the support of his coaches and teammates. On a recruiting trip to IU, track star Milt Campbell would advise Lyles against IU so Lyles would settle in his hometown university and play for Camp. The Central High product was a prize recruit for Louisville not only for his skill on the field but also to help attract other black players to the school. Louisville was coming out of a de-emphasis on sports and scholarships were now available to offer.

A four-year starter for the Cardinals, Lyles totaled 2,786 yards on the ground and scored a school-record 42 touchdowns in his storied career, including 18 in 1957 to set a single season record which stood for more than 40 years. He is the school's second all-time scoring leader with 300 points in his storied career. He became the first Cardinal to surpass the 1,000-yard mark in a single season. In 1957, his 1,207 yards not only earned him All-America acclaim but led all of college football. He was selected in the first round of the 1958 NFL Draft by the Baltimore Colts, where he teamed with Johnny Unitas.

Otto Knop
A four-year letterwinner at linebacker and center from 1949 to 1952, Otto Knop earned honorable mention Associated Press Little All-America honors as a sophomore and United Press International All-America his junior year. He was inducted into the UofL Athletic Hall of Fame in 1979 in its second induction class, and was inducted into the Kentucky Athletic Hall of Fame in 1994. His most memorable highlight was a fumble recovery that led to the tying touchdown in a stunning 13–13 deadlock at heavily favored Miami (FL) in 1950.

Lee Corso era (1969–1972)
Following Frank Camp's retirement, Navy defensive backs coach Lee Corso was hired to take over as Louisville's head football coach. Under Corso, the Cardinals went 28–11–3. Corso's final season saw the Cardinals finish 9–1 and ranked No. 18 in the final AP Poll. Corso would be the last coach until John L. Smith to leave Louisville with a winning record overall. After four seasons at Louisville, Corso left to become the head football coach at Indiana. Today, Corso is a well-known college football analyst for ESPN College Gameday.

Alley, Gibson and Weber (1973–1984)
Following Lee Corso's departure Louisville's football program struggled mightily as fan support grew weaker and weaker. The years between Corso's departure and Howard Schnellenberger's arrival are considered the dark years for Louisville football. Louisville only made one bowl appearance during the tenures of T. W. Alley, Vince Gibson and Bob Weber, the 1977 Independence Bowl, which they lost to Louisiana Tech. All three of those head coaches had losing records at Louisville. T. W. Alley was hired to replace Corso, but was fired after two unsuccessful seasons. Vince Gibson was then hired to lead the football program. During Vince Gibson's tenure at Louisville, Gibson nicknamed his team the "Red Rage". Although the moniker is no longer used to describe the football team, several other university organizations over the years have used the "Red Rage" nickname. Gibson had the best overall record of the three coaches between Corso and Schnellenberger at 25–29–2. After Gibson came Bob Weber, who went 20–35 in five seasons. After Weber's tenure, athletic officials considered dropping from Division I-A (now FBS) to I-AA (now FCS) in football, due to the program's on-the-field struggles and low attendance and fan support, but decided to stay at the I-A level.

Although this was a low point for the Cardinals in their history they did produce some notable NFL talent. Walter Peacock (1972–1975), Louisville's all-time leading rusher would become the first star of this era, at 3,204 yards Peacock would account for much of the Cards offense. On the defensive side of the ball Louisville Legends Frank Minnifield (1979–82), Otis Wilson (1977–79) and Dwayne Woodruff (1976–78) would go on to long NFL careers. Louisville would also begin producing elite wide receivers such as Ernest Givens (1984–85) and Mark Clayton (1979–82), Clayton would go on to become the first Cardinal to break the 1,000 yard mark with 1,112 receiving yards in a season (1981) until Arnold Jackson surpassed him in 1998. Joe Jacoby (1978–80) would go on to a very successful NFL career with 3 Super Bowls wins and becoming a 4 time Pro-Bowler for the Washington Redskins. Jacoby was not the only offensive line to see a long NFL career, Bruce Armstrong would go to play 13 season with the New England Patriots and accumulate 6 Pro-Bowls and 2 2nd team selections along the way.

Howard Schnellenberger era (1985–1994)

Following five unsuccessful seasons under the guidance of Bob Weber, Howard Schnellenberger, a native of Louisville and 1983 National Champion as the head football coach at Miami, was hired in hopes of making Louisville a national title contender for the first time. At the press conference announcing his hiring, Schnellenberger drew laughs when he said the Cardinals were "on a collision course with the national championship. The only variable is time."

Prior to accepting the Louisville job, Schnellenberger turned a lowly Miami football program that was nearly dropped from the athletic department into a national champion in five years. Schnellenberger also played at Kentucky for and served as offensive coordinator at Alabama under Bear Bryant. His best team was the 1990 unit, which went 10–1–1 and routed Alabama in the 1991 Fiesta Bowl en route to appearances in the final media polls.  The 1990 season highlighted what was, at the time, the most successful decade in U of L football history. His teams earned 90 percent of the school's all-time TV appearances, made its first-ever appearance in a major bowl and helped increase attendance by nearly 40 percent, an average over the past six years of more than 1,000 above stadium capacity.

His teams played a coast-to-coast schedule against the top conferences in the nation and produced victories over such teams as Texas (1), Alabama (1), Michigan State (1), North Carolina (1), Virginia (1), North Carolina State (1), West Virginia (1), Boston College (1), Arizona State (2) and Pittsburgh (4). 

Schnellenberger also took Louisville to the Liberty Bowl in 1993, where it defeated Michigan State. 1993 would become a reflection of what the coach was trying to build by scheduling Texas, Texas A&M, Tennessee, Arizona St., Pittsburgh and West Virginia. With Louisville announcing that it would give up independent status and join Conference USA, a weak football conference at the time, for the 1995 season, Schnellenberger left for Oklahoma after the 1994 season. Years later, he said that the Cardinals would not be able to compete for a national championship while playing in Conference USA. While he never won a national title at Louisville, he did revive a program that had been on life support when he arrived. For that reason, even though he had a losing overall record of 54–56–2 in 10 seasons, he remains in the good graces of Cardinal fans.

Schnellenberger's lasting legacy at U of L, however, is new Cardinal Stadium, which he proposed from the minute he arrived. Schnellenberger planned and raised the money for its construction, but left for Oklahoma before the stadium opened. In 2006, Louisville named the Cardinals' football fieldhouse the Howard L. Schnellenberger Football Complex with Schnellenberger in attendance before U of L's game against Florida Atlantic University. The most valuable player award for the annual UofL-UK game is also named for him because he was born and raised in Louisville and he played at Kentucky.

Ron Cooper era (1995–1997)
Following the departure of Howard Schnellenberger to Oklahoma, Ron Cooper was hired away from Eastern Michigan, where he had a 9–13 record in two seasons as the head football coach. Cooper had also been an assistant at Notre Dame under Lou Holtz. Cooper was the first African American head football coach in Louisville football history, and also the youngest. He was 32 years old when he was named head coach. The committee responsible for hiring Cooper was very impressed with Cooper's optimism and vision for the program.  Louisville went 6–5 and 5–6 in Cooper's first two seasons, but fell to 1–10 in Cooper's third and ultimately final season, prompting newly hired athletic director Tom Jurich to fire Cooper.

John L. Smith era (1998–2002)

After the firing of Ron Cooper, Jurich hired Utah State head coach John L. Smith as the new Louisville head football coach. Smith kick-started the program and went 7–5, 7–5, 9–3, 11–2 and 7–6 in his five seasons as head coach. On December 19, 2002, Smith accepted the head coaching job at Michigan State. He informed his Louisville players of the decision at halftime of the GMAC Bowl, which ended with a 38–15 loss to Marshall.

Bobby Petrino era (2003–2006)
Bobby Petrino, Auburn offensive coordinator and a former Louisville offensive coordinator under Smith, was hired to be the new head football coach. Petrino also served as offensive coordinator for the NFL's Jacksonville Jaguars under Tom Coughlin and tutored Jake Plummer while serving as an assistant coach at Arizona State. The high-scoring offense that was seen during John L. Smith's tenure got better under Petrino's guidance. The Cards earned national rankings as high as sixth in 2004 and 2006 during Petrino's tenure. Petrino went 41–9 in four seasons as head football coach, the best winning percentage (.82) of any head coach in Louisville football history. Prior to the 2006 season, Petrino agreed to a ten-year contract extension with Louisville, giving the impression he was going to be at Louisville for the long haul. Louisville went 12–1 in 2006, winning the Big East championship and the Orange Bowl, the school's first appearance in a Bowl Championship Series bowl game. The Cardinals had hopes of playing in the BCS National Championship Game before losing at Rutgers in November. After winning the Orange Bowl, and only six months after agreeing to a contract extension, Petrino left after accepting an offer to be the head coach of the NFL's Atlanta Falcons, a position he resigned before completing his first season, after 13 games.

Steve Kragthorpe era (2007–2009)
Less than 48 hours after Petrino's departure for the Atlanta Falcons, Steve Kragthorpe was hired from Tulsa, where he had gone 29–22 in four seasons as the head football coach. Things began to go downhill in Kragthorpe's first season as the Cardinals, fresh off an Orange Bowl win with most of the players returning, began the season ranked in the top 10 in the AP and Coaches' Poll but struggled to a 6–6 record and were not invited to a bowl for the first time since Ron Cooper's final season in 1997. A 5–7 2008 season followed that, and after finishing the 2009 season 4–8, Jurich fired Kragthorpe.  Much of the fan base and media felt like Kragthorpe underachieved, was not a strong recruiter, and never had control of the program throughout his tenure as head coach.

Charlie Strong era (2010–2013)

On December 9, 2009, Charlie Strong was hired as Louisville's 21st head coach.

After back to back 7–6 seasons in 2010 and 2011, Strong led Louisville to an 11–2 season in 2012 capped with a Sugar Bowl win over Florida, Louisville's second BCS game victory in school history, and after the season, Strong agreed to terms on a new contract that made him the seventh-highest paid head football coach in the country.

Strong's 2013 Cardinals team posted a 12–1 overall record with a dominating victory over Miami in the Russell Athletic Bowl. The 12-win season was the Cardinals' second in program history. On November 28, 2012, it was announced that Louisville would join the Atlantic Coast Conference, beginning in 2014. On January 4, 2014, it was announced that head coach Charlie Strong was leaving Louisville to accept the head football coach position at Texas.

Petrino's return (2014–2018)
In January 2014, seven years after leaving for the Atlanta Falcons, Bobby Petrino left Western Kentucky to return to Louisville as head coach after Strong's departure. In 2015, the team won the Music City Bowl in their second year under Petrino, in part due to the outstanding performance of freshman quarterback Lamar Jackson, who ran for 226 yards and scored four touchdowns.

The next season, Jackson, now the full-time starting quarterback, continued to impress, passing for 30 touchdowns and rushing for 21 more, leading Louisville to a 9–4 record, highlighted by a 63–20 win over then No. 2 Florida State. Jackson won the Heisman Trophy, Maxwell Award and Walter Camp Award, the first time a Louisville player had won any of the three. Despite the tremendous personal successes, the team lost in the Citrus Bowl to the slightly-favored LSU Tigers.

Unfortunately for Petrino and the Cardinals, Jackson's presence had masked severe deficiencies with the offensive line, running game and defense. Those weaknesses were exposed in full in 2018 following Jackson's departure for the NFL. The Cardinals bottomed out with a seven-game losing streak, including blowouts by Clemson and Syracuse by a combined score of 131–39. Days after the 54-23 loss to Syracuse, Petrino was fired with a 2–8 record. Secondary coach Lorenzo Ward was named interim coach to finish the season, which ended with two more losses. The Cardinals finished the season 2–10, their worst season in over two decades.

Scott Satterfield era (2018–2022)
On December 4, 2018, Louisville hired Scott Satterfield as the program's 22nd different head coach. Satterfield was previously the head coach of his alma mater Appalachian State for the last 6 seasons.

On December 5, 2022, the University of Cincinnati hired Scott Satterfield to be the program's next head coach, replacing Luke Fickell. Deion Branch was named interim head coach for the Cardinals bowl game against Cincinnati.

Conference affiliations
Louisville has been both independent and affiliated with multiple conferences.
 Independent (1912–1947,1949-1962)
 Ohio Valley Conference (1948)
 Missouri Valley Conference (1963–1974)
 Independent (1975–1995)
 Conference USA (1996–2004)
 Big East (2005–2012)
 American Athletic Conference (2013)
 Atlantic Coast Conference (2014–present)

Championships

Conference championships
Louisville claims nine conference championships.

† Co-champions

Division championships

† Co-champions

Bowl games
Louisville has been to 25 bowl games; their overall bowl record is 12–12–1. During the BCS era (1998–2013), the Cardinals appeared in two BCS bowl games. Louisville attended a bowl each season from 1998 to 2006, and had a streak of eight seasons with bowl appearances (2010–2017).

Head coaches

† Interim

Facilities

Cardinal Stadium

The Louisville Cardinals football team plays its home games at L&N Federal Credit Union Stadium, renamed from Cardinal Stadium in 2023. Prior to that the team played its games at Old Cardinal Stadium. The stadium was constructed with a capacity of 42,000 in 1998 for $63 million. However, the university completed a major expansion and renovation for the 2010 season. The $72 million project, which began in December 2008, features an elevated south-end terrace connecting the east and west sides of the stadium, 33 additional suites, 1,725 additional club seats, a second 100-yard-long club room, and 13,000 more chairback seats, bringing the total capacity to 55,000-plus.  The stadium was expanded again in 2018 adding 5,800 seats to bring the stadium to a total capacity of 60,800 seats.

Cardinal Stadium played host to its 20th season of Cardinal football in 2017. Specifically, since 1998, the Cardinals are 70–25 at home. Louisville went undefeated at home in 2001 and 2006 and won a school-record 20 straight home games from 2004 to 2007 (Syracuse snapped the streak with a 38–35 win in 2007). The structure, which sits on the south end of the metropolitan campus, is constructed with the ability for future expansion to more than 80,000 seats.

The Howard Schnellenberger Football Complex which honors the former Cardinal head coach, also sits inside the stadium area and houses the team's coaches, staff, training room, strength and conditioning area and academic services for the student athletes. Schnellenberger initially proposed building the on-campus Cardinal Stadium during his tenure at Louisville and is credited with keeping the project alive.

Old Cardinal Stadium

Cardinal Stadium is the name of a former college and minor league baseball and college football stadium in Louisville, Kentucky. It is on the grounds of the Kentucky Exposition Center, and was called Fairgrounds Stadium when it first opened its doors to baseball in 1957.  https://www.louisvillecardinal.com/2019/01/old-cardinal-stadium-set-to-be-demolished-after-63-years-of-existence/amp/ Cardinal Stadium was demolished in 2019. 

The lone Bluegrass Bowl was held here in 1958. Cardinal Stadium was home to the Louisville Raiders football team from 1960 through 1962. It was the home to two minor league baseball teams in Louisville: the Louisville Colonels in 1968–1972 and the Louisville Redbirds in 1982–1999. It was to be the home of the American League Kansas City Athletics when their owner Charles O. Finley signed a contract to move the team to Louisville in 1964, but the American League owners voted against the move. The Kentucky Trackers of the AFA played at Cardinal Stadium 1979–1980. It also served as the home of the University of Louisville football team from 1957 to 1997 and their baseball team 1998–2004. It was also used heavily as a high school football stadium, hosting state championship games from in 1964–2002, including hosting all four state championship games played annually 1979–2002. Several local schools also played some games in Cardinal Stadium prior to 1998, including the annual St. Xavier–Trinity rivalry featuring the two major boys Catholic high schools in the city (a game now played at Cardinal Stadium).

Trager Center
The University of Louisville's Trager Center indoor practice facility just north of Cardinal Stadium, was officially opened on Thursday, Dec 1 2019 and used by the Cardinal football team. The indoor practice facility features a 120-yard FieldTurf field, a 100-meter four-lane sprint track, pole vault and long jump pits, as well as, batting cages for both baseball and softball. It's also equipped for the soccer, field hockey and lacrosse teams to use.

Rivalries

Kentucky

Louisville and Kentucky football series was revived in 1994 after the success of the basketball series that restarted in 1983. They played all games at Commonwealth Stadium until the new Cardinal Stadium was completed in 1997. UK leads the all-time series 19-15 but Louisville leads the revived series 15–13 since 1994. Louisville played Kentucky in their first 4 seasons and twice in the 1920s holding the Cardinals scoreless in all contests. Kentucky then left the SIAA in 1922 and joined the Southeastern Conference and has limited its play of state schools since. It would be 70 years before these two schools would face each other again.

In 2013, it was announced that the game would be moved to the final game of the season following Louisville's 2014 move to the ACC. This scheduling change fits with other end of year SEC vs. ACC rivalry games such as Georgia vs. Georgia Tech, Florida vs. Florida State and South Carolina vs. Clemson. Kentucky leads the series 19–15 through the 2022 season.

Memphis

Louisville leads the series with Memphis at 24–19 through the 2019 season. The rivalry, which spanned over four difference conferences, started in 1948. The rivalry has been dormant since 2013.

Cincinnati

Cincinnati leads the series at 30–23–1 through the 2022 season. The rivalry started in 1929. Cincinnati won the first 12 meetings between the two teams, before Louisville won its first game against the Bearcats in 1970. The most recent meetings between the Cardinals and Bearcats were two overtime games in 2012 and 2013, both won by Louisville. The annual rivalry has been dormant since 2013, however the rivalry was reignited in 2022 in the Fenway Bowl. Fueled by former head coach Scott Satterfield leaving for Cincinnati days before the bowl, Louisville won 24-7 to retain the Keg of Nails.https://www.ncaa.com/live-updates/football/fbs/louisville-takes-down-cincinnati-2022-fenway-bowl#:~:text=December%2017%2C%202022-,Louisville%20wins%20Keg%20of%20Nails%2C%20Fenway%20Bowl%20%F0%9F%94%B4,in%20the%20first%20Fenway%20Bowl.

Traditions

Spirit team

Cardinal Bird

The cardinal was chosen as the mascot in 1913 by Dean John Patterson's wife to reflect the state bird of Kentucky. The suited mascot would not appear until 1953 when cheerleaders first suited up T. Lee Adams for action. Now the Cardinal Bird dubbed Louie appears at most Louisville sporting events and along with the spirit squad leads the crowds in cheers. During some home football games Louie could be seen parachuting into PJCS on occasion and in the stands starting the C-A-R-D-S chant to the crowd. Other duties are to lead the team onto the field at the start of the game and being a part of pregame and halftime marching band shows.

Cheerleading and Lady Birds
The cheerleading squads are a national powerhouse with the large co-ed squad winning 15 National Cheerleaders Association Collegiate National championships (1985–86, 1989, 1992, 1994, 1996, 1998–99, 2003–05, 2007–09, 2011), the all girl squad winning 9 championships (1998–99, 2001–05, 2009, 2011) and the small co-ed cheerleading squad winning 7 championships (2005–11). The University of Louisville Spirit Groups hold more national titles than any other sport offered at the university. The teams are coached by James Speed, Todd Sharp, Misty Hodges.

The University of Louisville Ladybirds are 20-time national champions winning its seventh national title in 2008, making back-to-back titles for the squad after the win in 2007. In 2004, they successfully defended their crowns from 2002 and 2003 at the National Dance Alliance Collegiate Championship and U of L also won the Universal Dance Association title in 1995 and 1997. The Ladybirds have long been successful, placing in the top five in the national competition 13 of the last 19 years. The group is under the direction of coach Sheryl Knight.

The Marching Cards

The University of Louisville Cardinal Marching Band is made up of students from UofL and Metroversity students from the Louisville area. The group has been featured on ESPN, ABC World News Tonight, Oprah, Sports Illustrated, Extreme Makeover:Home Edition, just to name a few. The Marching Cards also has various performance groups in the spring semester including a dance band, a brass band and a spirit band. The Marching Cards is the official band to perform "My Old Kentucky Home" each year at the Kentucky Derby since 1938.https://uoflbands.com/

Card March

The University of Louisville football program created its annual Card March tradition prior to all home football contests to help bring fans out to the stadium earlier and to give the football team added inspiration before the game. The tradition began when the team buses would stop on Denny Crum Overpass on Central Ave and walked through the tunnel towards the stadium. Changes arrived in 2013 with the Card March beginning approximately two hours and 15 minutes prior to the announced (example 1:15 p.m. for Sunday's 3:30 p.m. kickoff). The team buses will drop the players off at Floyd Street at the south end of the stadium, which is the entrance to the Bronze D/E lots. After exiting the buses, the team will proceed to enter Gate 4 and then head into the stadium. Fans are encouraged to arrive early and greet the players with the assistance of the UofL marching band, cheerleaders, and Ladybirds. Fans should take note, if there are any bad weather conditions during the scheduled Card March times, that the team will proceed to the back of the Howard Schnellenberger Football Complex and will not travel to the designated Card March location.

Johnny Unitas statue
In Cardinal stadium, on the flight deck, sits the legendary quarterback himself. One of UofL's most celebrated athletes, Johnny U's number 16 jersey is the only football Cardinal jersey with both it and the number retired. This statue helps commemorate Unitas' stellar career, as football players give him a rub for good luck before taking the field.

Helmets and logos

Louisville has experienced many changes in helmets over the years. Visually presented below is a list from 1960 to the present day. Before 1960 Louisville would use the traditional brown leather helmets until they would wear all white maskless helmets. Louisville jerseys would stay traditionally the same with plain white jersey with red lettering or a red jersey with black lettering. As seen in the picture of Fred Koster vertical stripes was the look for many national teams at the time. With more games being called on the radio the advent of numbers on the helmet and sleeves were made to help identify the players on the field. Sometime in the mid 2000s Louisville added a combination of new uniforms including an all black uniform as an alternative. Recently Louisville and Adidas finalized a contract for roughly $39 million. Since then Adidas and Louisville have paired on many great designs to catch recruits and medias attention. In most recent news Louisville sported an all chrome red helmet against Florida State University on September 17, 2016. A butterfly design was placed on the back of these specific helmets to give tribute to the late Muhammad Ali.

Individual honors and notable players

College football awards

Retired numbers

Honored jerseys (Ring of Honor)
Louisville has honored the jerseys of 18 former players in their "Ring of Honor". Those numbers remain active and can be chosen by future players.

All Americans and notable players
Consensus and unanimous first-team All-Americans in bold.

Notable

Players
 David Akers – former Philadelphia Eagles placekicker
 Jaire Alexander – former defensive back, in 2016 he was considered the best cover cornerback in all of College Football, Team Captain in 2017 season, drafted 18th overall in the 2018 NFL Draft by the Green Bay Packers
 Bruce Armstrong – former offensive lineman, notably with the New England Patriots
 Gary Barnidge – former tight end, most notably with the Cleveland Browns
 Deion Branch – former wide receiver, 2005 Super Bowl MVP with the New England Patriots
 John Brewer – fullback for the Philadelphia Eagles
 Teddy Bridgewater - quarterback, drafted in 2014 by the Minnesota Vikings, with the Denver Broncos
 Jeff Brohm – former quarterback with the San Diego Chargers, Washington Redskins, San Francisco 49ers, Tampa Bay Buccaneers, Denver Broncos and Cleveland Browns; now head coach at Purdue
 Doug Buffone – former linebacker, notably with the Chicago Bears
 Curry Burns – former safety, notably with the New Orleans Saints
 Michael Bush – former running back, drafted in 2007 by the Oakland Raiders
 Mark Clayton – former wide receiver, notably with the Miami Dolphins
 Geron Christian – former offensive lineman, was considered to be the team's best offensive lineman from the 2016 and 2017 season, team captain in 2017 season
 Elvis Dumervil - former defensive end, played for the Denver Broncos, Baltimore Ravens, and San Francisco 49ers
 Adam Froman – former quarterback
 William Gay – former cornerback, drafted by the Pittsburgh Steelers in the 2007 NFL Draft with the Pittsburgh Steelers
 Ernest Givins – former wide receiver, notably with the Houston Oilers
 Jay Gruden – former quarterback, six-time ArenaBowl champion, 1992 Arena Football League MVP, Arena Football League hall-of-fame coach, former head coach of the Washington Redskins
 Cole Hikutini – former tight end, played for Louisville in the 2015 and 2016 season after transferring from City of College of San Francisco, on the active roster with the San Francisco 49ers
 Gerod Holliman – former safety; 2014 Jim Thorpe Award recipient
 Arnold Jackson – former wide receiver from 1997 to 2000; broke the NCAA Division I record for career receptions with 300
Lamar Jackson - quarterback; 2016 Heisman Trophy winner and 2018 ACC Athlete of the Year across all men's sports; drafted 32nd overall in the 2018 NFL draft by the Baltimore Ravens, NFL MVP in 2019
 Joe Jacoby – former offensive lineman, notably with the Washington Redskins
 Chris Johnson – former cornerback, with the Baltimore Ravens
 Joe Johnson – former defensive end, notably with the New Orleans Saints and Green Bay Packers
 Scott Kuhn – former tight end, also with the Baltimore Ravens
 Stefan LeFors – former quarterback, 2004 AXA Liberty Bowl Offensive MVP, also formerly with the Winnipeg Blue Bombers of the Canadian Football League; now the head high school coach at Parkview Baptist School (Baton Rouge)
 Robert McCune – former linebacker, with the Baltimore Ravens
 Kevin Miller – former wide receiver, notably with the Minnesota Vikings
 Frank Minnifield – former cornerback, notably with the Cleveland Browns
 John Neidert – former linebacker, won Super Bowl III with New York Jets
 Roman Oben – former offensive tackle drafted by NY Giants played on Super Bowl winner Tampa Bay Buccaneers
 Will Rabatin – former offensive lineman
 Kerry Rhodes – former safety, with the Arizona Cardinals
 Eric Shelton – former running back, drafted in 2nd round of 2005 draft by the Carolina Panthers
 Kolby Smith – former running back, drafted by the Kansas City Chiefs in the 2007 NFL Draft
 Johnny Unitas – Pro Football Hall of Fame quarterback, notably with the Baltimore Colts
 Ted Washington – former defensive tackle, notably with the Buffalo Bills and New England Patriots
 Erik Watts – former quarterback and semi-retired professional wrestler
 Dwayne Woodruff – former defensive back, notably with the Pittsburgh Steelers

Future non-conference opponents
Announced schedules as of March 31, 2021.

 In Indianapolis, IN.

References

External links

 

 
American football teams established in 1912
1912 establishments in Kentucky